C series or series C, may refer to:

Finance and business
C Series Index, a consumer price index
Series C, venture capital round debenture funding
Series C Banknotes of Ireland

Transportation
Bombardier C-Series, a family of airplanes, now renamed Airbus A220
TNCA Series C, WWI Mexican fighter plane
Transperth C-series train
Opel Rekord Series C, executive car
Chevrolet C series trucks, see Chevrolet C/K
Chevrolet Series C Classic Six, including the Series C
Ford C series, large trucks
International Harvester C series, pickup trucks
Isuzu C/E series, including C-series trucks
Dodge C series, pickup trucks
Daihatsu C-series engine

Other uses
QI (C series), the third series of the TV quiz show QI
ISO 216#C series, for the paper sizes
Sony Vaio C series laptop computers
Sony Ericsson C series, a series of cell phones
Toshiba Satellite C series laptops
Compaq C series handheld computers

See also
 C (disambiguation)
 Series (disambiguation)
 C class (disambiguation)
 Class C (disambiguation)
 C-size (disambiguation)
 B series (disambiguation)
 D series (disambiguation)